Pablo Perruchoud  (born ) is an Argentine male track cyclist, representing Argentina at international competitions. He won the silver medal at the 2016 Pan American Track Cycling Championships in the team sprint.

References

External links

1992 births
Living people
Argentine male cyclists
Argentine track cyclists
Place of birth missing (living people)